Hot 92 can refer to:

 Hot 92 (pirate radio station) in Birmingham, England
 WJHT in Johnstown, Pennsylvania